The second Tăriceanu cabinet of the government of Romania was composed of 18 ministers, listed below. It was sworn in on 5 April 2007, and had since experienced some minister changes, including in the last months of term. It was a coalition government, formed by the PNL and the UDMR. Its term ended on 22 December 2008, when the new cabinet, headed by Emil Boc, received the vote of confidence from the Parliament and was sworn in at Cotroceni Palace.

Cabinets of Romania
2007 establishments in Romania
2008 disestablishments in Romania
Cabinets established in 2007
Cabinets disestablished in 2008